is a city located in Osaka Prefecture, Japan. , the city had an estimated population of 54,969 in 246822 households and a population density of 2900 persons per km².

Geography
Shijōnawate is located in the east-central part of Osaka Prefecture, about 15 km from the city center of Osaka. Two-thirds of the city area is the northern Ikoma Mountains. The city ranges in elevation from 3 meters to 361 meters above sea level.

Neighboring municipalities
Osaka Prefecture
Neyagawa
Katano
 Daitō
Nara Prefecture
 Ikoma

Climate
Shijōnawate has a Humid subtropical climate (Köppen Cfa) characterized by warm summers and cool winters with light to no snowfall.  The average annual temperature in Shijōnawate is 15.1 °C. The average annual rainfall is 1356 mm with September as the wettest month. The temperatures are highest on average in August, at around 27.2 °C, and lowest in January, at around 3.6 °C.

Demographics
Per Japanese census data, the population of Shijōnawate rose very rapidly in the 1960s and 1970s, and has since leveled off.

History
The area of the modern city of Shijōnawate was within ancient Kawachi Province, and was the site of the 1348 Battle of Shijōnawate. The village of Shijōnawate (written as 甲可村), was established within Sasara District with the creation of the modern municipalities system on April 1, 1889.  On April 1, 1896 the area became part of Kitakawachi District, Osaka. On April1,1932, the village adopted the present kanji for its name and was raised to town status on July 1, 1947. The neighboring village of Tahara was absorbed on June 25, 1961. On July 1, 1970 Shijōnawate was raised to city status.

Government
Shijōnawate has a mayor-council form of government with a directly elected mayor and a unicameral city council of 12 members. Shijōnawate, together with Daitō, contributes two members to the Osaka Prefectural Assembly. In terms of national politics, the city is part of Osaka 12th district of the lower house of the Diet of Japan.

Economy
Shijōnawate has a mixed economy with light manufacturing and agriculture. Due to its proximity to the Osaka metropolis, it has increasing become a commuter town.

Education
Shijōnawate has seven public elementary schools and four public middle schools operated by the city government and one public high school operated by the Osaka Prefectural Department of Education. The prefecture also operates one special education school for the handicapped.

Transportation

Railways
 JR West – Katamachi Line (Gakkentoshi Line) 

(Shijonawate Station is in neighboring Daitō)

Highways

Sister and Friendship city relations 
  Kihoku, Mie Japan - Friendship city agreement concluded in 1995 (with former Kiinagashima town)
 Meerbusch, North Rhine-Westphalia, Germany - The agreement was concluded in December 2010

Local attractions
 Shijōnawate Shrine
 Iimoriyama Castle - National Historic Site and one of the Continued Top 100 Japanese Castles.
 Grave of Kusunoki Masashige

Notable people from Shijōnawate 
Fuminori Ujihara, Japanese comedian (Rozan)
Hiroshi Yamashita, Japanese rugby union player
Nobutaka Imamura, Japanese professional baseball player
Tomomitsu Yamaguchi, Japanese comedian, actor, voice actor, singer and presenter
Yūgo Ishikawa, Japanese manga artist

References

External links

 Shijōnawate official website 

Cities in Osaka Prefecture
Shijōnawate